Ruslan Lisakovich (born 22 March 2002) is a Belarusian professional footballer who plays for Russian club Dynamo Makhachkala.

His brothers Vitali Lisakovich and Dmitry Lisakovich are also professional footballers.

International career
He made his debut for the Belarus national football team on 8 September 2021 in a World Cup qualifier against Belgium, a 0–1 home loss.

References

External links 
 
 

2002 births
Living people
People from Marjina Horka
Sportspeople from Minsk Region
Belarusian footballers
Belarus youth international footballers
Belarus under-21 international footballers
Belarus international footballers
Association football midfielders
FC Shakhtyor Soligorsk players
FC Uzda players
FC Krumkachy Minsk players
FC Isloch Minsk Raion players
FC Dynamo Makhachkala players
Belarusian Premier League players
Belarusian First League players
Belarusian expatriate footballers
Expatriate footballers in Russia
Belarusian expatriate sportspeople in Russia